Eleanor May "Ellie" Dickinson (born 4 June 1998) is an English road and track cyclist, who last rode for UCI Women's Team , and represents Great Britain at international competitions.

As a junior, she competed at the 2015 UCI Road World Championships in the women's junior road race.

On the track she won the gold medal at Round 1 of the 2016–17 UCI Track Cycling World Cup in the team pursuit, in Glasgow.

Major results

2016
 1st  Team pursuit  – Glasgow, UCI Track Cycling World Cup
 2nd Omnium, Track-Cycling Challenge Grenchen
 1st Scratch race, Revolution Champions League – Round 1, Manchester
 Revolution Round 3, Manchester
1st Scratch race
2nd Points race
 2nd Madison, National Track Championships (with Alice Barnes)
2017
 UEC European Track Championships
1st  Madison (with Elinor Barker)
2nd Team pursuit
 UEC European Under-23 Track Championships
1st  Madison (with Manon Lloyd)
2nd  Individual pursuit
2nd  Scratch
2nd  Omnium
 Grand Prix Poland
1st Points Race
1st Team Pursuit
 1st  Team pursuit, National Track Championships
 4th Overall Six Days of London
3rd Omnium
2018
 1st  Team pursuit, UEC European Track Championships
 2nd Team pursuit, UCI Track World Championships
 National Road Championships
2nd Under-23 road race
3rd Road race

References

External links

1998 births
Living people
English female cyclists
British track cyclists
Sportspeople from Carlisle, Cumbria
European Championships (multi-sport event) gold medalists
21st-century English women